Guillermo Laborde (24 October 1886, Montevideo - 13 May 1940, Montevideo) was an Uruguayan painter, sculptor and designer.

Biography 
He received his first art lessons at the Círculo de Bellas Artes in Montevideo with Carlos María Herrera. After 1912, he studied in Florence, Rome, Paris and Spain; supported by a grant from the Uruguayan government. He returned to Montevideo in 1921 and, in 1923, began working as a teacher at the Escuela Industrial, the Círculo Fomento de Bellas Artes and the Institutos Normales de Montevideo. 

Together with José Cuneo Perinetti, Carmelo de Arzadun, Alfredo De Simone and Petrona Viera he became one of the founders of the "Planismo" movement; named after their technique of painting in austere, geometric "planes" with bright colors. His portrait of the art critic, Luis Eduardo Pombo (1900-1976) is considered to be a prime example of that style.

In addition to painting, he also created sculptures and graphic designs, as well as designs for costumes, theater and carnival sets. His best known design was the official poster for the first FIFA World Cup in 1930; which was awarded first prize in a competition held by the Centennial Commission.

He died suddenly after completing the set designs for a performance of La damnation de Faust, produced by SODRE.

Selected works

References

External links 

 Biographical notes and chronology @ Porton de San Pedro
 Guillermo Laborde in the Museo Nacional de Artes Visuales, Montevideo.
 Works by Laborde @ Anáforas

1886 births
1940 deaths
Uruguayan painters
Uruguayan male artists
Uruguayan designers
People from Montevideo
Male painters